Apsley may refer to:

Places 
 Apsley, Hertfordshire, a suburb of Hemel Hempstead, Hertfordshire, England
 Apsley railway station
 Apsley, Ontario, a community in North Kawartha, Ontario, Canada
 Apsley, Tasmania, a locality in Tasmania, Australia
 Apsley, Victoria, a town in Victoria, Australia

People 
Allen Apsley (disambiguation)
 Apsley Pellatt, an English glassware manufacturer and politician
 Apsley Pellatt (1763–1826), his father
 Apsley Cherry-Garrard, an English explorer of Antarctica
Henry Bathurst, 2nd Earl Bathurst, also known as Lord Apsley, a British politician and lawyer

Rivers 
 Apsley River (New South Wales), Australia
 Apsley Falls
 Apsley River (Tasmania), Australia, see Douglas-Apsley National Park

Other
 Apsley House, a building in London, UK
 Apsley Business School - London

See also
 Apsley End, a hamlet in Bedfordshire, UK